The 1983–84 European Cup was the 19th edition of the European Cup, IIHF's premier European club ice hockey tournament. The season started on October 5, 1983, and finished on August 12, 1984.

The tournament was won by CSKA Moscow, who won the final group.

First round

 VEU Feldkirch,   
 HC Bolzano,   
 Dynamo Berlin,  
 Djurgårdens IF    :  bye

Second round

 HIFK,   
 EV Landshut,   
 Dukla Jihlava,  
 CSKA Moscow    :  bye

Third round

Final Group
(Urtijëi, Italy)

Final group standings

References 
 Season 1984

1983–84 in European ice hockey
IIHF European Cup